Kittipong Wongma (born September 14, 1995) is a Thai professional footballer who plays for Thai League 2 club Suphanburi.

Playing career
On 3 December 2014, Kitipong who was 19 years old moved from Sisaket United in Division 2 to Sisaket in Thai League 1. He had the impressive performance for the club in his first season on the top league.

On 28 January 2016, Kittipong Wongma moved to Udon Thani in  Division 2 by a loan contract.

International career
On 8 July 2015, Kittipong made an appearance in the match of Thai League All-Star against Reading F.C.

References

External links
Profile at Thai Premier League Official Website

1995 births
Living people
Kittipong Wongma
Kittipong Wongma
Association football forwards
Kittipong Wongma
Kittipong Wongma
Kittipong Wongma